Rodionov is a common Russian last name, and may refer to several people:

Andrey Rodionov (born 1954), Russian composer
Aleksei Rodionov (born 1947), Russian cinematographer
Denis Rodionov (born 1985), Kazakh footballer
Igor Rodionov (1936–2014), Russian general and former Defense Minister of Russia
Ivan Rodionov (1851–1881), Russian poet
Jurij Rodionov (born 1999), Austrian tennis player
Mikhail Rodionov (1907–1950), Soviet statesman and politician
Mikhail Rodionov (pilot), Soviet pilot during World War II, Hero of the Soviet Union
Nikolai Rodionov (1915–?), Soviet statesman and diplomat
Sergey Rodionov (born 1962), Russian football coach
Sergey Rodionov (physicist) (1907–1968), Russian physicist
Vitali Rodionov (born 1983), Belarusian footballer
Vladimir Rodionov (1878–1954), Russian chemist
Yevgeny Rodionov (1977–1996), Russian soldier killed in Chechen captivity

See also 
Rodionova

Surnames
Russian-language surnames